Ellen Garrison Jackson Clark (April 14, 1823 – December 21, 1892) was an African American educator, abolitionist and early Civil Rights activist, whose defiance of "whites only" social spaces has been compared to Rosa Parks' actions in the 20th century. After decades spent crisscrossing the East Coast, the South and Midwest in the service of teaching literacy, Clark eventually settled in Pasadena, California for health reasons. She was buried in an unmarked grave in Altadena. In 2021, the Altadena Historical Society successfully lobbied to provide Clark's grave with a memorial headstone.

Early life 
Clark was born to Jack Garrison and Susan Robbins in the Concord, Massachusetts home of her grandfather Caesar Robbins, a formerly enslaved free man and veteran of the Revolutionary War. Jack Garrison had lived the life of a free man after emancipating himself from enslavement in New Jersey. The family home is now The Robbins House Museum. At the time of Clark's birth in 1823, Concord was open to freed slaves and abolitionists. Her mother Susan was a founding member of The Concord Ladies’ Anti-slavery Society and its first black member. In 1857, Clark married John W. Jackson, a free black gardener from Delaware who worked for a time with naturalist and philosopher Henry Thoreau. Clark was widowed in 1862. 

Clark signed petitions that demanded equal rights for Native Americans and desegregation of Massachusetts trains and Boston schools.

Civil War and Reconstruction 
During the Civil War, Clark taught at a private school in Newport, Rhode Island. There were many opportunities to teach freed African Americans of all ages. This path led her to a long association with the American Missionary Association (AMA), an abolitionist Protestant group dedicated to the abolition of slavery, education, and racial equality. Moving between towns and teaching, Clark developed a message of Black Unity, writing:  

"I think it is our duty as a people to spend our lives in trying to elevate our own race".

Utilizing her passport as proof of her full citizenship and a free person, Clark ventured on AMA trips across Virginia and Maryland, always teaching freed former slaves to read and write, and often facing hostile racism due to her activities. In 1870, due to funding issues, the AMA had to discontinue their contract with Clark, but she soon found more teaching opportunities with a Quaker organization.

Baltimore 1866: standing up for Civil Rights 
By 1866, Clark was working as a schoolteacher in Baltimore, Maryland. On May 5, at Baltimore's train station, Clark and her colleague Mary J. C. Anderson were forcibly ejected from a ladies-only waiting room. They had refused requests to leave, stating that they had the right to be in the waiting room in accordance with the Civil Rights Act of 1866, which granted African American citizens the same rights as white citizens. At the time of this event and the subsequent legal action, the Act was unratified. According to Clark - "We were thrown out. We were injured in our persons as well as our feelings for it was with no gentle hand that we were assisted from that room and I feel the effects of it still". Intending to test train depot segregation in light of the 1866 Civil Rights act, Ellen and Anderson brought  suit against the station master, an employee of the Philadelphia, Baltimore, and Wilmington Railroad, who threw them out of the waiting room, seeking to charge him with assault. Initially, the court case was assigned to a judge who was sympathetic to civil rights, but the station master requested a jury. The case was subsequently not mentioned again in the local media, and it assumed that Clark and Anderson declined a jury trial, as an all-white jury would have been unlikely to convict.

Nevertheless, the case is a significant event in the history of Civil Rights activism, with many sources pointing out its resonance with Rosa Parks’ actions and legal case.

Later life 
In the 1880s, Clark joined a migration movement of Black "Exodusters", thousands of freed slaves who the government encouraged to homestead in Kansas and elsewhere in the Midwest. These towns were often granted new schools and other basic amenities. Clark met and married her second husband, Harvey Clark.  

Clark contracted tuberculosis, then called “consumption,” and moved westward with her husband and sister, eventually settling in Pasadena, California. Clark died from her illness on December 21, 1892. She was buried in Altadena's Mountain View Cemetery in a registered but unmarked grave. On Juneteenth, 2021, Clark received a headstone through a campaign by the Altadena Historical Society.

References 

1823 births
1892 deaths
African-American activists
African-American schoolteachers
19th-century American women educators
19th-century American educators
Schoolteachers from Rhode Island
People from Concord, Massachusetts
Tuberculosis deaths in California
Activists for African-American civil rights
19th-century deaths from tuberculosis